Sir Cecil Cuthbert Parrott  (29 January 1909 - 23 June 1984) was a British diplomat, translator, writer and scholar.

After studies at Peterhouse, Cambridge, he became a teacher. He joined the Foreign Office in 1939. His diplomatic career culminated with his posting to Prague, where he was the British Ambassador from 1960 to 1966. On retiring from the Foreign Office, he became first Professor of Russian and Soviet Studies and later Professor of Central and South-Eastern European Studies and Director of the Comenius Centre at the University of Lancaster.

Parrott is best known for his translation of Jaroslav Hašek's The Good Soldier Švejk. He also translated some of Hašek's short stories, The Red Commissar.  He also wrote a study of Hašek's short stories 

He  wrote two autobiographical volumes, The Tightrope and The Serpent and the Nightingale, as well as his biography of Hašek, The Bad Bohemian.

His son, Jasper Parrott, is a businessman involved in artists' management.

Notes

External links
Profile, NationalArchives.gov.uk
Profile, gazettes-online.co.uk
Propagandistic documentary Vysoká hra (1977), where is mentioned also Cecil Parrott (in Czech, first mentioned at time 4:54)

1909 births
1984 deaths
Academics of Lancaster University
Alumni of Peterhouse, Cambridge
Ambassadors of the United Kingdom to Czechoslovakia
English translators
Members of HM Diplomatic Service
Knights Commander of the Order of St Michael and St George
Officers of the Order of the British Empire
20th-century British translators
20th-century British diplomats